FK Baník Most 1909 was a Czech football club based in the city of Most, approximately 75 kilometres north-west of Prague. The club played top-flight football for the first time in their history in the 2005–06 Czech First League.

The club's home stadium is Fotbalový stadion Josefa Masopusta, which was built in 1961. The opening match of the new stadium was played on 24 May 1961 against English side Liverpool F.C., which won against Most 4–1.

In 2011, Baník Most signed an agreement whereby Arsenal Česká Lípa would function as their farm team.

History

Historical names 

 1909 — SK Most (full name: Sportovní klub Most)
 1948 — ZSJ Uhlomost Most (full name: Základní sportovní jednota Uhlomost Most)
 1953 — DSO Baník Most (full name: Dobrovolná sportovní organizace Baník Most)
 1961 — TJ Baník Most (full name: Tělovýchovná jednota Baník Most)
 1979 — TJ Baník SHD Most (full name: Tělovýchovná jednota Baník Severočeské hnědouhelné doly Most)
 1993 — FK Baník SHD Most (full name: Fotbalový klub Baník Severočeské hnědouhelné doly Most)
 1995 — FC MUS Most 1996 (full name: Football Club Mostecká uhelná společnost Most 1996, a.s.)
 2003 — FK SIAD Most (full name: Fotbalový klub SIAD Most, a.s.)
 2008 — FK Baník Most
 2013 — FK Baník Most 1909

Early history and Lower League Football 
The club was founded on 19 May 1909, and there were very basic beginnings.  Football activity in Most would be interrupted for significant periods of time during World War I and World War II, but even long thereafter, the quality of football in Most remained modest, as Most would play in the lower Czechoslovak leagues from the 1950s all the way through to the 1980s.

In the 1990s though, Most earned two promotions – first to the Bohemian Football League, the third-highest league in the country, then, in the 1996/97 season, to the Czech 2. Liga.

SIAD ownership and First Division Football 
In the spring of 2003 the club was bought by Italian industrial gas company SIAD, and the Italian company's involvement sparked a modestly but increasingly successful new era for the club.  The club took the name "FK SIAD Most" from the 2003/04 season.

By winning the 2. liga championship in the 2004/05 season, Most finally gained promotion to the Czech First League, for the 2005/06 season. Extensive reconstruction of the club's stadium – which included the installation of a new pitch, 7,500 seats, and floodlights – was completed in time for the club's first match in the top flight.  After a slow start, manager Přemysl Bičovský was dismissed, making way for the arrival of Zdeněk Ščasný.  Scasny – a highly regarded manager, who had previously been in charge of Czech clubs AC Sparta Prague and FK Viktoria Žižkov and Greek clubs OFI Crete and Panathinaikos FC – helped the club hold its position in the Czech First League, guiding the team to a respectable 10th place in the table.

For the 2006/07 season, the club had high expectations, with the ultimate goal being to finish in the top half of the table, but inconsistency would plague the team throughout the season.  The team seemed capable of competing with the league's top sides, especially at home – Most managed to draw with AC Sparta Prague (eventual league champions), defeat Slavia Prague (eventual runners-up) and was overall unbeaten at home against the clubs who would finish in the top 5 league positions – but the team was less efficient when playing away from home, and an even bigger problem was an inability to consistently take full advantage of the relatively weaker sides of the league.  This translated into Most finishing the season with a league-high 16 draws, good enough only for a somewhat disappointing 12th place in the league, but the club's top-flight status was secured once again.

At the end of the season the club and manager Zdeněk Ščasný mutually decided to end their relationship, and the club hired Robert Žák, who had previously been in charge of the club's youth set-up.

Honours 
Czech 2. Liga
 Winners (1): 2004–05
Czech Cup
 Semifinals: 2001–02

Managers and players

Head coaches in club's history
Head coaches in club's history

2004  Přemysl Bičovský
2005  Zdeněk Ščasný
2007  Robert Žák
2009  Martin Pulpit
2010  Jorge Aňon
2011  Michal Zach
2013  Zbyněk Busta
2013  Pavel Chaloupka
2014  Vít Raszyk
2014  Wolfgang Jerat
2015  Pavel Medynský
2015  Robert Vágner
2016  Stanislav Hofmann

Notable former players

 Patrik Gedeon
 Stanislav Hofmann
 Petr Johana
 Josef Masopust
 Jiří Novotný
 Horst Siegl
 Jiří Štajner
 Goce Toleski
 Martin Vaniak

History in domestic competitions 

 Seasons spent at Level 1 of the football league system: 3
 Seasons spent at Level 2 of the football league system: 15
 Seasons spent at Level 3 of the football league system: 7
 Seasons spent at Level 4 of the football league system: 1

Czech Republic 

Notes

References

External links 
  

Defunct football clubs in the Czech Republic
Association football clubs established in 1909
Association football clubs disestablished in 2016
Czech First League clubs
 
Mining association football clubs in the Czech Republic
1909 establishments in Austria-Hungary
2016 disestablishments in the Czech Republic